Miguel Ángel Seijas Cuestas (born 20 May 1930) is a retired rower from Uruguay who represented his country at the 1952 Summer Olympics in Helsinki, Finland. There he won the bronze medal with Juan Rodríguez in the men's doubles sculls event. Seijas also competed at the 1956 Summer Olympics. He was born in Montevideo.

References
 databaseOlympics
 Miguel Seijas Biography and Olympic Results | Olympics at Sports-Reference.com

1930 births
Living people
Rowers at the 1952 Summer Olympics
Rowers at the 1956 Summer Olympics
Olympic rowers of Uruguay
Olympic bronze medalists for Uruguay
Place of birth missing (living people)
Olympic medalists in rowing
Uruguayan male rowers
Medalists at the 1952 Summer Olympics
20th-century Uruguayan people